The following is a list of actors who have played Dr. Watson in various media.

Radio and audio dramas

Stage plays

Television and DTV films

Television series

Theatrical films

Video games

See also
List of actors who have played Sherlock Holmes
List of actors who have played Inspector Lestrade
List of actors who have played Mycroft Holmes
List of actors who have played Mrs. Hudson
List of actors who have played Professor Moriarty

References 

Actors who have played Dr. Watson
Watson